Mount Jennings  is a peak rising to about  immediately south of Mount Roy in the Barker Range of the Victory Mountains, in Victoria Land, Antarctica. It was named by the New Zealand Antarctic Place-Names Committee after Peter Jennings, a field assistant and mechanic with the Victoria University of Wellington Antarctic Expedition Evans Névé field party, 1971–72.

References

Mountains of Victoria Land
Borchgrevink Coast